Joseph Gold may refer to:

 Joseph Gold (lawyer) (1912–2000), international law scholar and long-time official of the International Monetary Fund
 The chemist who proposed the medical use of hydrazine sulfate in 1970s
Joe Gold (1922–2004), American gym owner
Joe Dan Gold (1942–2011), American basketball player and coach